Fornika is the seventh studio album by German hip hop group Die Fantastischen Vier. The name does not refer to the term of fornication. It comes from a strange misspelling of a pizza delivery service person that delivered pizza to the band's studio. Though they totally misspelled the name on the doorbell ("Fornika" instead of "Wernicke" and street "Emnhof" instead of "Immenhofer"), the pizza was still delivered. The name "Fornika" is an inside-band term for "strange things".

Track listing
"Mehr nehmen"
"Ernten, was wir säen" (feat. Münchener Freiheit)
"Einfach sein" (feat. Herbert Grönemeyer)
"Yeah Yeah Yeah"
"Nikki war nie weg"
"Fornika" (feat. Günter Amendt)
"Du mich auch"
"Mission Ypsilon" (instrumental)
"Ichisichisichisich"
"Einsam und zurückgezogen"
"Flüchtig"
"Du und sie und wir"
"Was bleibt" (feat. Max Herre)

Premium edition bonus disc
"Road to Fornika" (video)
"Ernten, was wir säen" (music video)

iTunes exclusive
Customers of the iTunes Store, who pre-ordered the album, also got exclusive live recordings of the band. These include:

"Spießer '94"
"Old School Medley"
"Locker bleiben"
"Geboren"

Charts

Weekly charts

Year-end charts

Singles

"Einfach sein" was the 43rd best-selling single of 2007 in Germany.

References

Die Fantastischen Vier albums
2007 albums